A list of films produced by the Marathi language film industry based in Maharashtra in the year 1969.

1969 Releases
A list of Marathi films released in 1969.

References

Lists of 1969 films by country or language
1969 in Indian cinema
1969